Yucunicoco Mixtec is a Mixtec language of Oaxaca.

Egland & Bartholomew found Yucunicoco to have only 50% intelligibility with Juxtlahuaca Mixtec. Comprehension of Mixtepec Mixtec is 85%, but in the other direction only 45%.

References 

Mixtec language